The Munster Council is  a provincial council of the Gaelic Athletic Association sports of hurling, Gaelic football, camogie, rounders and handball in the province of Munster.

County boards
 

Cork
Clare
Kerry
Limerick
Tipperary
Waterford

Hurling

Provincial team
The Munster provincial hurling team represents the province of Munster in hurling. The team competes in the Railway Cup.

Honours
Railway Cups: 46
1928, 1929, 1930, 1931, 1934, 1937, 1938, 1939, 1940, 1942, 1943, 1944, 1945, 1946, 1948, 1949, 1950, 1951, 1952, 1953, 1955, 1957, 1958, 1959, 1960, 1961, 1963, 1966, 1968, 1969, 1970, 1976, 1978, 1981, 1984, 1985, 1992, 1995, 1996, 1997, 2000, 2001, 2005, 2007, 2013, 2016

Current panel

Players

Players from the following county teams represent Munster: Clare, Cork, Kerry, Limerick, Tipperary and Waterford.

Notable players

Competitions

Inter-county

Record
All-Ireland Senior Hurling Championships: 72
Cork: 1890, 1892, 1893, 1894, 1902, 1903, 1919, 1926, 1928, 1929, 1931, 1941, 1942, 1943, 1944, 1946, 1952, 1953, 1954, 1966, 1970, 1976, 1977, 1978, 1984, 1986, 1990, 1999, 2004, 2005
Tipperary: 1887, 1895, 1896, 1898, 1899, 1900, 1906, 1908, 1916, 1925, 1930, 1937, 1945, 1949, 1950, 1951, 1958, 1961, 1962, 1964, 1965, 1971, 1989, 1991, 2001, 2010, 2016, 2019
Clare: 1914, 1995, 1997, 2013
Limerick: 1897, 1918, 1921, 1934, 1936, 1940, 1973, 2018, 2020, 2021, 2022
Waterford: 1948, 1959
Kerry: 1891

Club

Football

Provincial team
The Munster provincial football team represents the province of Munster in Gaelic football. The team competes in the Railway Cup.

Players

Players from the following county teams represent Munster: Clare, Cork, Kerry, Limerick, Tipperary and Waterford.

Honours
Railway Cup: 15
1927, 1931, 1941, 1946, 1948, 1949, 1972, 1975, 1976, 1977, 1978, 1981, 1982, 1999, 2008

Inter-county

Competitions

Record
All-Ireland Senior Football Championships: 50
Kerry: 1903, 1904, 1909, 1913, 1914, 1924, 1926, 1929, 1930, 1931, 1932, 1937, 1939, 1940, 1941, 1946, 1953, 1955, 1959, 1962, 1969, 1970, 1975, 1978, 1979, 1980, 1981, 1984, 1985, 1986, 1997, 2000, 2004, 2006, 2007,2009, 2022
Cork: 1890, 1911, 1945, 1973, 1989, 1990, 2010 
Tipperary: 1889, 1895, 1900, 1920
Limerick: 1887, 1896

Club

Camogie

Gael Linn Cup
The Munster camogie team won the premier representative competition in the women’s team field sport of camogie, the Gael Linn Cup on 20 occasions, in 1961, 1963, 1964, 1966, 1980, 1982, 1990, 1992, 1994, 1995, 1996, 1997, 1998, 1999, 2001, 2002, 2003, 2004, 2005 and 2009.

Gael Linn Trophy
The Munster provincial junior camogie team won the Gael Linn Trophy on 17 occasions in 1975, 1977, 1978, 1980, 1983, 1985, 1987, 1988, 1992, 1994, 1996, 1997, 2003, 2004, 2005, 2008 and 2011.

Inter-county honours

References

External links
Munster GAA website

 
 
 
Provincial councils of the Gaelic Athletic Association
Gaelic